Strana Ochrany Prav Romov is a political party in Slovakia which defends the rights of the Romani people.

Political parties of minorities in Slovakia
Romani political parties